Gordon Glen Mathers (born 29 September 1981) is a professional Australian darts player. He currently plays in Professional Darts Corporation (PDC) events.

In 2017 he finished top of the DPA Australian Pro Tour ranking table, and made his World Championship debut in the 2018 event. In the preliminary round he faced Japanese Seigo Asada, to whom he lost 1-2 in sets.

In 2018, Mathers continued playing in Australia on the DPA circuit, winning a tournament in Hobart and making it to the final on two other occasions. In August he played in the Brisbane Masters, a tournament under PDC World Series of Darts, where he lost in the first round 1-6 to Raymond van Barneveld. 

In 2019, Mathers won two DPA tournaments in East Devonport and in April he won the Sunshine State Classic, a tournament organised by the BDO, where he defeated Jeremy Fagg in the final. 

Mathers attempted to get a Tour card in PDC Q-school 2020, his best result was a last-64 on the last day and hence did not gain his Tour card. After that, Mathers stayed for the first four tournaments of the PDC Challenge Tour, reaching the semifinal of the third tournament. He returned to Australia and at the end of the season he topped the DPA Pro Tour, which secured him a spot in the 2021 PDC World Darts Championship. There, he lost 0-3 in the first round against German Max Hopp.	

In January 2021 he played in the PDC UK Q-school and although he was unable to win the Tour card directly, he placed 8th in the UK Q-school Order of Merit and earned a two-year Tour card. In his first season as a professional, he played in the 2021 UK Open, where he lost in the first round to Kirk Shepherd. Throughout the season, Mathers appeared only in Players Championship tournaments and failed to qualify for any other major tournaments. In November he lost in the final of the PDPA Qualifier for the 2022 PDC World Darts Championship against Nick Kenny. He served as a second reserve player for the World Championship and after the withdrawals of Charles Losper (replaced by Mike De Decker) and Juan Rodriguez, Mathers entered the tournament as the second highest ranked runner-up from the PDPA Qualifier. In the first round he played Jason Heaver and lost 1-3 in sets.

World Championship results

PDC
 2018: Preliminary  round (lost to Seigo Asada 1–2)
 2021: First round (lost to Max Hopp 0–3)
 2022: First round (lost to Jason Heaver 1–3)

Performance timeline

PDC

References

External links

1981 births
British Darts Organisation players
Professional Darts Corporation former tour card holders
Living people
Australian darts players
People from Brisbane